Cinzia Frosio is an Italian former competitive figure skater. She is a two-time (1973, 1974) Italian national champion and competed at nine ISU Championships, finishing in the top ten at the 1973 Europeans in Cologne.

Frosio was a member of Associazione Sportivi Ghiaccio Ambrosiana (A.S.G.A) in Como. Her coaches included Helmut Seibt and Inge Regner-Seibt. By January 1973, when she won her first senior national title, she had moved from Italy to Denver, Colorado to train under Carlo Fassi. In October of the same year, she competed at the inaugural Skate Canada International.

Competitive highlights

References 

Italian female single skaters
Living people
Sportspeople from Como
Year of birth missing (living people)
20th-century Italian women